Chioninia stangeri (English common name: Stanger's skink) is a species of lizard in the family Scincidae. The species is endemic to the Cape Verde Islands.

Geographic range
C. stangeri is found on the islands of  São Vicente, Santa Luzia, Ilhéu Branco, and Ilhéu Raso.

Habitat
The preferred natural habitat of C. stangeri is shrubland.

Reproduction
C. stangeri is viviparous.

Etymology
The specific name, stangeri, is in honor of English explorer William Stanger.

References

Further reading
Boulenger GA (1887). Catalogue of the Lizards in the British Museum (Natural History). Second Edition. Volume III. ... Scincidæ ... London: Trustees of the British Museum (Natural History). (Taylor and Francis, printers). xii + 575 pp. + Plates I-XL. (Mabuia stangeri, pp. 157–158 + Plate VI, figures 2, 2a).
Gray JE (1845). Catalogue of the Specimens of Lizards in the Collection of the British Museum. London: Trustees of the British Museum. (Edward Newman, printer). xxviii + 289 pp. (Euprepis stangeri, new species, p. 112).

stangeri
Endemic vertebrates of Cape Verde
Fauna of Sal, Cape Verde
Fauna of Boa Vista, Cape Verde
Fauna of Santiago, Cape Verde
Reptiles described in 1845
Taxa named by John Edward Gray